Forepark is the RandstadRail station in the industrial area of Leidschenveen-Ypenburg, a neighbourhood in The Hague, Netherlands. The station features 2 platforms on either side of a viaduct. These have a high and a low platform, with RandstadRail 3 and RandstadRail 4 using the lower platforms, and line E using the higher platforms.

History
The station opened, as part of the RandstadRail project, on 3 September 2007 for the RET metro service (line E) and the HTM tram services (3 & 4)

Train services
The following services currently call at Forepark:

Bus service
This service departs from street level, 50m north of the station at the bus stop Loire.

 Bus 60 (Leidschenveen - Station Leidschenveen - Station Forepark - Forepark - Station Ypenburg - Nootdorp - Delft - Station Delft)

Railway stations opened in 2007
RandstadRail stations in The Hague